is a women's private university headquartered in Toyoake, Aichi, Japan, with its so-called Nagoya Campus there.  There is another campus in Toyota, Aichi. The school was established in 1990 as a junior college and then became a four-year college in 1998.  The earliest predecessor was a nursing school established in 1903, which became a girls' high school in 1923, which continues to operate today.

References

External links
 Official website 

Educational institutions established in 1903
Private universities and colleges in Japan
Universities and colleges in Aichi Prefecture
1903 establishments in Japan
Toyoake, Aichi
Toyota, Aichi